Hill's horseshoe bat is the common name for two species of horseshoe bat:

Rhinolophus hilli
 Hills' horseshoe bat (Rhinolophus hillorum)

Animal common name disambiguation pages